The discography of Japanese singer songwriter Fayray consists of eight studio albums (one of which is a cover album), twenty-two singles and four video albums.

Discography

Studio albums

Singles

Video releases

Video/live albums
 1999: Moving Fayray
 2001: Fayray Clips 2000–2001
 2003: Seraphic Fayray in New York + 5 Clips
 2005: Fayray Live Tour 2004 Hourglass: Love at last

Sales

Sales by year

References

External links

Discographies of Japanese artists